Winston County is a county of the U.S. state of Alabama. As of the 2020 census, the population was 23,540. Its county seat is Double Springs. Known as Hancock County before 1858, the county is named in honor of John A. Winston, the fifteenth Governor of Alabama.

History
Winston County was established under the name Hancock County on February 12, 1850, from territory that was formerly part of Walker County (a county directly to the south of Winston County). It was originally named for John Hancock, Governor of Massachusetts and famous signer of the American Declaration of Independence, with its county seat at Houston.  On January 22, 1858, the county was renamed Winston County to honor Alabama Gov. John A. Winston.

During the American Civil War, Winston County gained attention for its opposition to secession, a sentiment so strong that the county is sometimes referred to as the Free State of Winston. This area had few slaves and saw little benefit to secession. The county today plays on its reputation as the "Free State of Winston" to attract tourists. The county's opposition to the Confederacy is briefly mentioned in the novels To Kill a Mockingbird and Addie Pray.

In 1883, the county seat was moved from Houston to Double Springs to be near the center of the county, since Cullman County was created from the eastern part of Winston County.

The civil-rights judge Frank Minis Johnson of the U.S. Court of Appeals for the Eleventh Circuit was born in Delmar, in Winston County.

National Register of Historic Places
Winston County has four sites listed on the National Register of Historic Places: Archeological Site No. 1WI50, Feldman's Department Store, the Houston Jail, and the Winston County Courthouse.

Geography

Adjacent counties
Lawrence County (north)
Cullman County (east)
Walker County (south)
Marion County (west)
Franklin County (northwest)

National protected area
 William B. Bankhead National Forest (part)

Demographics

2020 census

As of the 2020 United States census, there were 23,540 people, 9,592 households, and 6,268 families residing in the county.

2010 census
At the 2010 census there were 24,484 people, 10,163 households, and 7,074 families living in the county. The population density was 40 people per square mile (15/km2). There were 13,469 housing units at an average density of 22 per square mile (8.5/km2). The racial makeup of the county was 95.6% White, 0.5% Black or African American, 0.7% Native American, 0.2% Asian, 0.1% Pacific Islander, 1.5% from other races, and 1.4% from two or more races. Nearly 2.6% of the population were Hispanic or Latino of any race.
There were 10,163 households, 26.2% had children under the age of 18 living with them, 54.2% were married couples living together, 10.9% had a female householder with no husband present, and 30.4% were non-families. Nearly 27.1% of households were made up of individuals, and 12.2% were one person aged 65 or older. The average household size was 2.38, and the average family size was 2.86.

The age distribution was 21.6% under the age of 18, 7.4% from 18 to 24, 23.6% from 25 to 44, 29.6% from 45 to 64, and 17.7% 65 or older. The median age was 43.1 years. For every 100 females, there were 96.5 males. For every 100 females age 18 and over, there were 100.8 males.

The median household income was $33,685 and the median family income  was $39,784. Males had a median income of $38,074 versus $23,301 for females. The per capita income for the county was $18,055. 15.4% of the population and 20.6% of families were below the poverty line. 31.4% of those under the age of 18 and 14.4% of those 65 and older were living below the poverty line.

2000 Census
At the 2000 census there were 24,843 people, 10,107 households, and 7,287 families living in the county.  The population density was 40 people per square mile (16/km2).  There were 12,502 housing units at an average density of 20 per square mile (8/km2).  The racial makeup of the county was 97.32% White, 0.038% Black or African American, 0.46% Native American, 0.13% Asian, 0.01% Pacific Islander, 0.90% from other races, and 0.81% from two or more races. Nearly 1.5% of the population were Hispanic or Latino of any race.
There were 10,107 households, 31.80% had children under the age of 18 living with them, 59.6% were married couples living together, 9.10% had a female householder with no husband present, and 27.9% were non-families. Nearly 25.6% of households were made up of individuals, and 11.4% were one person aged 65 or older.  The average household size was 2.43, and the average family size was 2.89.

The age distribution was 23.7% under the age of 18, 7.90% from 18 to 24, 28.7% from 25 to 44, 25.5% from 45 to 64, and 14.2% 65 or older.  The median age was 38 years. For every 100 females, there were 96 males.  For every 100 females age 18 and over, there were 93.5 males.

The median household income was $28,435 and the median family income  was $32,628. Males had a median income of $26,206 versus $17,760 for females. The per capita income for the county was $15,738.  17.1% of the population and 12.9% of families were below the poverty line.   21.8% of those under the age of 18 and 23% of those 65 and older were living below the poverty line.

Religion
At the 2010 US Religion Census:
 Southern Baptist Convention (11,113)
 The United Methodist Church (1,117)
 Churches of Christ (978)
 Church of God (Cleveland) (784)
 Assemblies of God (295)
 Catholic Church (223)

Government and politics
Unlike nearly every other county in the Deep South, and in keeping with its history during the American Civil War, Winston County has always been a bastion of support for the Republican Party, even as the Democratic Party utterly dominated Alabama state politics from the end of Reconstruction until the passage of the Civil Rights Act of 1964. For example, in four consecutive presidential elections from 1936 to 1948, Winston County was the only county in the state to vote for the Republican ticket. In 1932, the county backed Democrat Franklin D. Roosevelt by just a single vote, even while Roosevelt carried the state as a whole overwhelmingly. And in 1912, Winston County joined just three other Alabama counties in voting for the Bull Moose Party candidacy of Theodore Roosevelt. The county also voted for Populist candidate James B. Weaver in 1892.

The only Democrat to win the county since 1936 (or to get a majority in it since 1880) has been Jimmy Carter in 1976, and in recent times Winston County has become comparably Republican to the Texas Panhandle. Winston County did vote for George Wallace in 1968, who was the Democratic candidate in the state. Winston was the only county in Alabama to give a majority of its votes to Republican candidate Thomas E. Dewey in 1948 over Dixiecrat Strom Thurmond. In 2020, Republican Donald Trump won just over 90% of the vote in Winston County, the best for any candidate in the county's history.

Transportation

Major highways
 U.S. Highway 278
 State Route 5
 State Route 13
 State Route 33
 State Route 129
 State Route 195
 State Route 243

Rail
Norfolk Southern Railway

Communities

City
Haleyville (partly in Marion County)

Towns
Addison
Arley
Double Springs (county seat)
Lynn
Natural Bridge
Nauvoo (partly in Walker County)

Unincorporated communities
 Boar Tush
 Delmar
 Glen Mary
 Houston
 Posey Field

Ghost towns
 Batts Nest
 Corinth

See also
National Register of Historic Places listings in Winston County, Alabama
Properties on the Alabama Register of Landmarks and Heritage in Winston County, Alabama

References

External links

 Winston County is covered by the Northwest Alabamian Newspaper.
 Winston County map of roads/towns (map © 2007 Univ. of Alabama).
 Winston County, Alabama: The Free State of Winston 
 Winston County article in the Encyclopedia of Alabama

 

 
Counties of Appalachia
1850 establishments in Alabama
Populated places established in 1850